North Deep Creek is a rural locality in the Gympie Region, Queensland, Australia. In the  North Deep Creek had a population of 392 people.

History 
Named and bounded by the Minister for Natural Resources 1 December 2000. Regazetted by the Minister for Natural Resources, Mines and Energy and Minister for Trade on the 5 March 2010 due to the council amalgamations under the Local Government Reform Impl

North Deep Creek Provisional School opened in 1921. By 1924 it had become North Deep Creek State School. It closed in 1967.

In the  North Deep Creek had a population of 392 people.

References 

Gympie Region
Localities in Queensland